Venkatapuram is a locality and a ward in Alwal neighbourhood of Hyderabad city. It is administered as Ward No. 135 of Greater Hyderabad Municipal Corporation.

References 

 

Neighbourhoods in Hyderabad, India
Municipal wards of Hyderabad, India